Lutz's poison frog (Ameerega flavopicta; formerly Epipedobates flavopicta) is a species of frog in the family Dendrobatidae found in Bolivia and Brazil.
Its natural habitats are subtropical or tropical moist lowland forests, subtropical or tropical moist montane forests, moist savanna, subtropical or tropical moist shrubland, rivers, intermittent freshwater marshes, and rocky areas.
Reproduction occurs in rocky pools and streams. Eggs are laid under a rock and the male transports tadpoles to wet trenches or small rocky pools. It is threatened by habitat loss.

Breeding
Lutz's poison frog males call for females in breeding sites, such as rock crevices, termite nests, low vegetation or trenches. Breeding periods for this species were seen to begin with male calling during months of October to December, then sights of tadpoles were during November to April, and finally froglets were recorded during January to April.

References

Ameerega
Amphibians described in 1925
Taxonomy articles created by Polbot